Kevin O'Neill (born 1925) is an Australian soccer player who played the majority of his career for Cessnock at club level and for Australia in international football.

In 2000, O'Neill was inducted into the Soccer Australia Hall of Fame. In May 2021, at the age of 95, O'Neill was noted for being the oldest living former player of the Australia national football team.

References

1925 births
Living people
People from the Hunter Region
Sportsmen from New South Wales
Australian soccer players
Soccer players from New South Wales
Association football utility players
Australia international soccer players
Sydney FC Prague players
Lake Macquarie City FC players